"The Start of the New Century" ("Der Antritt des neuen Jahrhunderts") is a poem written by Friedrich Schiller early in the 19th century, possibly in 1801. It deals with the Peace of Lunéville and the Napoleonic Wars.

Sources
 Jochen Golz (ed.), Schiller. Sämtliche Werke, Berliner Ausgabe, Vol. I, Gedichte, Aufbau-Verlag, Berlin 1980, S. 497 f.

Poetry by Friedrich Schiller